Ryvingen Lighthouse is a coastal lighthouse located on the  island of Låven in the North Sea. It is the southernmost lighthouse in Norway. It is located in the municipality of Lindesnes in Agder county. The west side of the fjord is marked by the Hatholmen Lighthouse.

The lighthouse sits just south of the island of Skjernøy and northwest of the skerry of Pysen (the southernmost part of Norway). Ryvingen Lighthouse was first lit in 1867 and it was automated in 2002, and is listed as a protected historical site.  In 2002, it was transferred to the town of Mandal which has restored the buildings and made them available for overnight accommodations.

It is painted red with a white, horizontal stripe encircling it. The 996,500-candela light emits four white flashes every 40 seconds. The lighthouse also emits a racon signal in the form of the morse code letter M (− − ). The lighthouse is attached to a -story crew quarters building which is now available for overnight rentals. The island is only accessible by boat.

Media gallery

See also

Lighthouses in Norway
List of lighthouses in Norway

References

External links 

 Norsk Fyrhistorisk Forening 

Lindesnes
Lighthouses completed in 1867
Lighthouses in Agder
Listed lighthouses in Norway